The California Baptist Lancers men's basketball team represents California Baptist University in the Western Athletic Conference. The team  made the jump into Division I basketball on July 1, 2018. They are currently led by head coach Rick Croy and play at the CBU Events Center, which opened in 2017 and replaced the Van Dyne Gym. The men's basketball program will be ineligible for play in the NCAA Division I Tournament during their transition period, although they can be eligible for other tournaments such as the College Basketball Invitational.

History
The men's basketball program began playing at the NAIA level in 1969 and stayed at that level until 2010, competing in the Golden State Athletic Conference. In 2010, California Baptist Lancers moved up in all sports to the NCAA Division II, joining the Pacific West Conference in all sports on July 1, 2011. In January 2017, the California Baptist Lancers announced their transition to NCAA Division I, joining the Western Athletic Conference on July 1, 2018, in all sports. The school will be eligible for the NCAA Division I postseason tournament in the 2022–23 season.

Postseason results

College Basketball Invitational (CBI) results
The Lancers have appeared in the College Basketball Invitational (CBI) twice. Their record is 0–2.

NCAA Division II tournament results
The Lancers have appeared in 5 NCAA Division II Tournaments. Their combined record is 7–5.

NAIA tournament results

See also
California Baptist Lancers women's basketball

References

 
1969 establishments in California
Basketball teams established in 1969